Tooro, or Rutooro, is a Bantu language spoken mainly by the Toro people (Batooro) from the Toro Kingdom region of western Uganda. There are three main areas where Rutooro as a language is mainly used and they are Kabarole District, Kyenjojo District and Kyegegwa District. Rutooro is unique among Bantu languages as it lacks lexical tone. It is most closely related to Runyoro.

See also
 Runyakitara language
 Yega Orutooro

References

Languages of Uganda
Nyoro-Ganda languages